Star Bird is the name of a toy made from 1978 to 1981.

Starbird is a surname. Notable people with the surname include:

Alfred Starbird (1912–1983), American athlete and general
George Starbird (1908–1994), American politician
Kate Starbird (born 1975), American basketball player
Margaret Starbird (born 1942), American Christian writer
Michael Starbird (born 1948), American mathematician